Grays International is an English sports equipment manufacturing company based in Robertsbridge, East Sussex. The company was founded in 1855 by rackets champion H. J. Gray, producing equipment for cricket, field hockey, netball, rugby union and tennis, through its brands and subsidiaries.

It has a sister company, "Gray-Nicolls Sports Pty Ltd.", based in Cheltenham, Australia.

History 
In 1855 The company of "H. J. Gray and Sons" was founded in Cambridge by Henry John Gray, who started manufacturing wooden racquets for Cambridge students, among them Ranjitsinjhi, King Edward VII and King George VI. in 1941 Alison Gray merged the company with hockey stick manufacturer J. Hazells, to form Grays Hockey and also acquired the world-renowned cricket bat business of L. J. Nicolls, resulting in Gray-Nicolls.

The 1980s and 90s expansion meant Grays International had to move the headquarters to larger premises in Robertsbridge, a village in East Sussex, where it remains to this day. The company grew by expanding into clothing and footwear, and by acquisitions including the Gilbert Rugby brand, which doubled the size of the company in 2002. It is still run by members of the Gray family.

Brands and products 
Each brand of Grays International is focused on one sport:

References

External links
 

Sportswear brands
English brands
British companies established in 1855
Manufacturing companies established in 1855
Sporting goods manufacturers of the United Kingdom
Companies based in Cambridge
Tennis equipment manufacturers
1855 establishments in England